Jüri Jaakson VR III/1 ( in Karula, Kreis Fellin, Livonia, Russian Empire – 20 April 1942 in Sosva, Sverdlovsk Oblast, Soviet Union) was an Estonian businessman and politician.

Life and career 

Jaakson studied in H. Treffner's Private High School and studied law at Tartu University from 1892 to 1896. He graduated with a 1st degree diploma (simple graduation). In 1897-1914 he worked as lawyer firstly in Viljandi, and later in Riga. In 1915-1919, Jaakson was a member of the Board of the Tallinn City Bank (Tallinna Linnapank).

Jaakson was a member and Assistant Chairman of the Estonian Provincial Assembly (Eesti Maapäev) in 1917–1918. In 1918 he was General Commissioner of the Provisional Government for taking over property from the German occupation powers. During 1918–1920 he worked as Minister of Justice of the Provisional Government and the Government of the Republic. In 1920–1932 Jaakson was a member of the I–IV Riigikogu. Jaakson was Elder of State from December 1924 to December 1925. In 1926-1940 he worked as President of the Bank of Estonia and was a member of the National Economic Council. Also, Jaakson was member of the National Council (Riiginõukogu, second chamber of the Riigikogu in 1938-1940). Jaakson was founder of several banks and participated in several organizations like the Central Society of the North Estonian Farmers and the Council of the Tallinn Economic Union.

Death 
Jaakson was imprisoned by the Soviet secret service NKVD on 14 June 1941. In Russia he was sentenced to death because of "counterrevolutionary activities" and executed the next year.

Awards
 1920 - Cross of Liberty III/I
 1925 - Order of the Three Stars I
1925 - Order of the Three Stars, 1st Class with Chain (Latvia)
 1930 - Order of the Cross of the Eagle I

References

 Jaakson's biography on the website of the President of Estonia (Old site)
 Ülo Kaevats et al. 2000. Eesti Entsüklopeedia 14. Tallinn: Eesti Entsüklopeediakirjastus, 

1870 births
1942 deaths
People from Viljandi Parish
People from Kreis Fellin
Estonian People's Party politicians
National Centre Party (Estonia) politicians
Heads of State of Estonia
Government ministers of Estonia
Chairmen of the Bank of Estonia
Members of the Estonian Provincial Assembly
Members of the Estonian Constituent Assembly
Members of the Riigikogu, 1923–1926
Members of the Riigikogu, 1926–1929
Members of the Riigikogu, 1929–1932
Members of the Estonian National Assembly
Members of the Riiginõukogu
Hugo Treffner Gymnasium alumni
University of Tartu alumni
Recipients of the Cross of Liberty (Estonia)
Recipients of the Military Order of the Cross of the Eagle, Class I
Estonian people executed by the Soviet Union
Executed prime ministers